Slappy and the Stinkers is a 1998 American family adventure comedy film directed by Barnet Kellman. The film stars B. D. Wong and Bronson Pinchot. Its plot concerns a group of children who try to save an abused sea lion from a greedy circus owner.

Plot
At prestigious private school Dartmoor Academy, principal Morgan Brinway is forcing the second-graders to study opera appreciation. Five feisty kids (leader Sonny, contraption making Loaf, movie loving Domino, sympathetic albeit tough Lucy, and the reluctant participating Witz), nicknamed the "Stinkers" by Mr. Brinway, are secretly skipping class to create chaos on the school grounds. Witz becomes the test pilot for a flying chair, one of Sonny's newest ideas. The Stinkers go to Groundskeeper Roy's shed and steal his leaf blower. Before that, they stole Mr. Brinway's desk chair. The Stinkers fail to notice that the leaf blower was not entirely duct taped onto the desk chair. When turned it on, the leaf blower flew off the contraption but left Witz sitting in the chair. The leaf blower was heading straight for Mr. Brinway's new convertible, but the leaf blower ran out of gas before it could destroy the car. However, Roy accidentally obliterates the car's side door with his lawn mower's edging blade. Mr. Brinway warns the Stinkers they will be expelled if they mess up one more time, but they soon rebel while trying to keep a low profile and are involved in even more misadventures.

When the kids discover sea lion Slappy during an aquarium field trip, Sonny and the others decide to free him by smuggling him back onto the school bus and hide him in Mr. Brinway's hot tub; as a form of celebrating their success, they have a party. After Mr. Brinway arrives home earlier than usual, the Stinkers retrieve Slappy and hide him at Witz's house. Roy mistakes the sea lion for a giant gopher and sets out to kill him. Animal broker Anthony Boccoli plans to steal Slappy and sell him to a Bulgarian circus, but some of his attempts to catch Slappy fail.

The next day, the Stinkers take Slappy with them to the beach so they can set him free, but Slappy refuses to leave. The kids discover there was an orca (which they assume is Willy from Free Willy) swimming nearby and that's why Slappy didn't want to go in the water since orcas eat sea lions. Sonny decides they should return Slappy to the aquarium, but they have to first attend a festival at Dartmoor. Roy tries to dispose of Slappy which causes the festival attractions to get ruined. Assuming this was caused by the Stinkers, Mr. Brinway expels them. The Stinkers discover that Boccoli kidnapped Slappy, which prompts the kids to set off on a rescue mission.

The group locates Boccoli's hideout and disposes of him by squirting him with water, blowing sawdust onto his body and shooting him with Roy's gopher bomb gun. After saving Slappy, the Stinkers get chased by Boccoli. Mr. Brinway and the class go on a hiking field trip to look at birds, which gets interrupted when the Stinkers crash through and Mr. Brinway becomes part of the getaway. After being chased to a log flume, the Stinkers and Mr. Brinway escape Boccoli by going down it; Boccoli tries to drown the group by turning on the flume, but the water is blocked by a beaver's nest and once he removes it, a beaver bites him and the water splashes him, causing him to slide down the spillway. The Stinkers, Slappy and Mr. Brinway safely land into the lake below, whereas Boccoli falls onto a floating log. Roy, who is also the school bus driver, ties a rope around Boccoli. Slappy is returned to the aquarium, Mr. Brinway withdraws the Stinkers' expulsion and they become heroes.

Cast
B. D. Wong as Morgan Brinway, the headmaster of Dartmoor Academy Brinway is an uptight, snobbish, strict and impatient headmaster with a passionate dislike for The Stinkers the main students who cause the most trouble. He has a preoccupation with expelling The Stinkers but the ideas tend to be overruled by his teaching assistant Harriett who is supportive of them. He is considered to be a very boring teacher by having students participate in opera, and gives tedious lectures on field trips. He is hostile to all of his students even Spencer and Max whom he only pretends to claim are his favorite students because he wants Spencer’s rich prestigious father to join the board of the academy. His only real enjoyment out of life seems to be his car, sarcastically insulting students as well as Roy and Harriet and listening to opera in his home with his dog Gordon whom he lives alone with. This was one of Wong’s few starring roles as he is known to be a character actor in films like Father of the Bride 1 & 2, the Jurassic Park and Jurassic World franchises, and on television series like Oz and Law and Order Special Victims Unit.
Bronson Pinchot as Roy, the groundskeeper of Dartmoor Academy Roy is the irresponsible and dim witted groundskeeper similar to Bill Murray’s character of Carl Spackler in the film Caddyshack. Despite his irresponsibility, he has an extreme amount of patience with The Stinkers and is generally a better role model for them than Mr. Brinway because he is understanding and supportive as well as genuinely encouraging to them, even when they steal his leaf blower at the beginning of the film. He is usually a target of sarcastic insults from Mr. Brinway due to his ineptitude and laid-back demeanor. He also serves as the bus driver for school field trips. Like Murray’s aforementioned character he is obsessed with keeping gophers off the school grounds and goes to excessive lengths to do so, even mistaking Slappy for a gopher. 
Jennifer Coolidge as Harriet, Mr. Brinway's assistant who speaks with a funny foreign accent, is somewhat socially awkward and very supportive of the Stinkers. It’s never directly said but implies she is a Swedish immigrant. She persuades Brinway not to expel them and usually will try to serve as a voice of reason to Brinway’s over the top aloof and strict demeanor. She becomes very impatient with Brinway when he initially expels The Stinkers and dislikes that Brinway calls them that nickname which she finds demeaning.
Joseph Ashton as Sonny, leader of the Stinkers
Gary LeRoi Gray as Domino, a member of the Stinkers, he is obsessed with and constantly quotes movies 
Carl Michael Lindner as "Witz" Witzowitz, a member of the Stinkers he is very timid and is a hypochondriac, and tends to be very reluctant to participate in The Stinkers mischief but is usually peer pressured to do so.
Scarlett Pomers as Lucy, a member of the Stinkers she is sweet and supportive towards her friends but is very aggressive towards Spencer Dane Jr and Max when they bully The Stinkers. Like the rest of the gang she fears and is timid around Mr. Brinway when they get into trouble.
Travis Tedford as Loaf, a member of the Stinkers and the group's mechanic generally one of the more patient Stinkers but he can get especially aggressive towards Spencer and Max like Lucy and likes to pull pranks on Mr. Brinway when he is able to get away with it.
David Dukes as Spencer Dane Sr., Spencer Dane Jr.'s father a rich and prestigious businessman whom Brinway wants on Dartmoor’s board. He takes a brief shine to Harriet. Although he initially ignores Brinway’s attempts to join the board, he reconsiders during a school festival but ultimately declines after an accident at the festival injures his son.
Spencer Klein as Spencer Dane Jr., Mr. Brinway claims him to be his favorite student but can be as hostile to Spencer and his friend Max as he is towards the Stinkers. Due to his impatience Brinway doesn’t really care about the well being of Spencer or Max and only pretends to be nice to Spencer in hopes that he can get Spencer Dane Sr. to join Dartmoor’s board. He also uses Spencer and Max to spy on the Stinkers when they cause mischief and Spencer and Max tattle to Brinway to get the Stinkers in trouble resulting in them getting academic probation by Brinway. Spencer and Max are cruel and insulting towards The Stinkers and bully them with open hostility. The Stinkers usually get their revenge on the two by pranking them.
Sam McMurray as Anthony Boccoli, a criminal animal broker who has attempted to steal Slappy from the aquarium multiple times to sell him to a circus. When The Stinkers intervene Boccoli is cruel and even later violent towards them. Despite The Stinkers preventing him from taking Slappy it is unknown what happens to Boccoli at the end of the movie though he was most likely arrested for theft and attempted murder.
Terry Urdang as Nancy
Bodhi Pine Elfman as Tag
Terri Garber as Mrs. Witzowitz, Witz's Mom
Jamie Donnelly as Aquarium Information Woman
Frank Welker as Slappy and Gordon

Production
Production of the film was announced by TriStar Pictures and The Bubble Factory alongside The Pest as two projects the companies would produce. Under the terms of a contract between The Bubble Factory and Universal Studios, the production company could automatically greenlight three to four pictures – budgeted at about $8 million to $35 million each – per year for Universal to distribute. Both this film and The Pest fell below Universal's threshold and became a first-look pact. Sony fully financed both films.

Reception
The film holds a 0% "rotten" rating on review aggregator Rotten Tomatoes based on five critics.

Box office
The film received a limited theatrical release, and made $34,488 in its first weekend of three weeks of theatrical exhibition. It  earned a total box office gross of $80,837.

References

External links

1990s adventure films
1990s children's comedy films
1998 films
American children's adventure films
American children's comedy films
Films about pinnipeds
Films about animal rights
Films scored by Craig Safan
TriStar Pictures films
1998 comedy films
1990s English-language films
Films directed by Barnet Kellman
1990s American films